The 1998 Ugandan Super League was the 31st season of the official Ugandan football championship, the top-level football league of Uganda.

Overview
The 1998 Uganda Super League, known as the Nile Special League Serie A, was contested by 8 teams and was won by SC Villa. The second level, known as the Nile Special League Serie B, was contested by 9 teams and was won by Health.  At the end of the season Serie A and B were combined and the Super League reverted to its original format.

League standings

Nile Special League Serie A (First Level)

Nile Special League Serie B (Second Level)

Leading goalscorer
The top goalscorer in the 1998 season was Charles Kayemba of SC Villa with 18 goals.

Footnotes

External links
 Uganda - List of Champions - RSSSF (Hans Schöggl)
 Ugandan Football League Tables - League321.com

Ugandan Super League seasons
1
Uganda
Uganda